Joseph Reaiche (born 20 March 1958) is an Australian former rugby league footballer who played in the 1970s and 1980s. He played in the New South Wales Rugby League Football Competition (NSWRL), now called the National Rugby League (NRL). He debut his rookie year with the Eastern Suburbs Roosters Rugby League team (now the Sydney Roosters) in 1978, then with the Canterbury-Bankstown Bulldogs and the South Sydney Rabbitohs.

Of Lebanese Australian heritage, Reaiche later relocated to Florida to work for the Church of Scientology; he is no longer a member. Reaiche is the father of actors Alanna Masterson and Jordan Masterson.

Early life and education
Reaiche was born in the suburb of Redfern in Sydney, Australia; he is the middle sibling of a younger brother and sister and two older brother. He began playing rugby league with his brother Tony with the local kids at Redfern Park adjacent to Redfern Oval, home to the South Sydney Rabbitohs. The two brothers would watch the Rabbitoh games by climbing the Oval's 10-foot high barbed wire fence.

By the age of 10 Reaiche went to St Mary's Cathedral College, Sydney a Roman Catholic Secondary School in the city, where he played in his first official Rugby League team. He also was selected to play representative district football for the Sydney Roosters Juniors.

Time in Lebanon
In October 1972, Reaiche and his family moved to Beirut, Lebanon. Reaiche attended the Good Shepherd Secondary Institute (GSSI) School in the suburb of Achrafieh. Reaiche and his brother played soccer with the school's team while teaching the other students how to play Rugby League.

Professional career
In 1977 Reaiche returned to playing Rugby League. He captained the Christian Brothers' High School, Lewisham First's XIII Rugby League team. That year he was the highest point scorer in the metropolitan college league division, and was awarded "Best & Fairest Player" by Rugby League player Ron Coote. Later that year, the school team lost its coach due to an unexpected death, so Joe took over the coaching job and lead the team to victory in the Metropolitan Catholic Colleges Sports Association (MCC) Final at Henson Park defeating Marcellin College Randwick, where he scored 13 of the team's 25 points in their 25-15 victory.

In January 1978, at the age of 19, Reaiche was drafted into the Sydney Roosters Rugby League Squad, where he played in their First Grade team with notable players such as Arthur Beetson, Bob Fulton, Russell Fairfax, Mark Harris, Bill Mullins and Kevin Hastings. In 1981, he played for the Canterbury Bulldogs, where he played alongside the Mortimer Brothers (Steve Mortimer, Peter and Chris), the Hughes Brothers (Greg Hughes, Mark and Gary) and the Gearin Brothers (Steve Gearin; Paul and Greg) - who all went to Christian Brothers' High School, Lewisham.

In 1982 he played first grade for the South Sydney Rabbitohs.

Personal life
During his rugby career, Reaiche began practising Scientology. After finishing his final year in 1983 with the Sydney Roosters, he relocated to Clearwater, Florida to join the Church of Scientology's elite Sea Org. While a Scientologist, he met Carol (née Masterson), who had two children of her own: Danny (b. 1976) and Christopher (b. 1980). They married in 1985 and had two children together: son Jordan (b. 1986) and daughter Alanna (b. 1988).

Reaiche and his wife left the Sea Org in 1986 and moved to California in 1993 to further their kids' acting careers with Carol as manager; they divorced in 1995. Both remained active in the Church, but in 2005 Joe was expelled and declared a 'Suppressive Person.' As a result, Reaiche is estranged from his children and stepchildren, all still current Scientologists, who have 'disconnected' from Joe under orders from the Church.

In a 2010 interview with Four Corners, Reaiche claimed to have spent around a half million dollars on Scientology over three decades. He accused the Church of Scientology of framing him for financial misconduct, which he denies, as a pretense for expelling him, after he complained about its management and fundraising practices. He further supported a review of the Church's favorable tax status in Australia: "[Scientology]'s not really a church... it may have a philosophy that's religious, but it's strictly business."

Reaiche currently works in the insurance and health industry.

References 

1958 births
Living people
Sydney Roosters players
Canterbury-Bankstown Bulldogs players
South Sydney Rabbitohs players
Australian rugby league players
Australian people of Lebanese descent
Former Scientologists
Critics of Scientology
Rugby league players from Sydney